Barbara Matera may refer to:
 Barbara Matera (politician), Italian television announcer, actress and politician
 Barbara Matera (costume designer), American costume and clothing designer